In season 2014–15, Veria will compete in the following competitions Super League and Greek Cup.

Players

Squad information

Out on loan

Last updated: 28 January 2015  
Source: Squad at Veria FC official website

Transfers

Summer Transfers

In:

Out:

Winter Transfers

In:

 

Out:

Technical and medical staff

Season Milestones
On August 6, 2014 it was announced by Georgios Arvanitidis that he is in takeover talks with the local businessman Theodoros Karipidis.
The first goal in 2014–15 Super League was scored by Alexandros Vergonis against Skoda Xanthi in a 3–2 home victory on 24 August 2014.
On September 14, 2014 the football players of Veria released an announcement, reporting the Argentinian player of Kerkyra, Horacio Cardozo for a racist attack to the Italian football player of the club, Nicolao Dumitru.
The first goal in 2014–15 Greek Cup was scored by Nicolao Dumitru on 24 September 2014 in a 4–1 home victory against Ermionida.
On 8 October 2014 it was announced that the owner change was completely as Giorgos Arvanitidis moved his sharehold to Theodoros Karipidis.
On 12 January 2015, Iván Malón was invited by the district attorney to testify about the game between PAOK vs Veria, which is marked as suspected fixed match.
On 7 May 2015, Giorgos Lanaris quit his post of team manager as he appears to be involved in a fixed game against Olympiacos F.C. back in 2012–13 season.
On 20 May 2015, Super League's court found Veria innocent as she was accused for fixing the game against Olympiacos F.C. in 2013.

Fixtures & Results

Overall

Last updated: 28 December 2014Source: Competitions

Pre-season Friendlies

Fixtures

1.Matchday 6 was suspended after the decision of the Deputy Minister of Culture and Sport, Giannis Andrianos, in memory of Kostas Katsoulis, that was killed in the riots during the match between Irodotos and Ethnikos Piraeus on 14 September 2014 for the Football League 2. See here for more information.
2.Matchday 11 was suspended after the decision of the Hellenic Football Federation president, Giorgos Sarris, not to put referees in matches, because of the attack that had been made against referee Christoforos Zografos.

Last updated: 12 May 2015Source: Superleague Greece

League table

Results summary

Results by matchday

Greek Cup

Second round

Third round

First leg

Second leg

Players Statistics

Overall

Numbers in parentheses denote appearances as substitute. Players with number struck through and marked  left the club during the playing season.

Source: Superleague Greece
Note: (*) Indicates that player left the club before season finale.

Goals

Last updated: 12 May 2015
(*) Left the club before season finale
Source: Match reports in Competitive matches  0 shown as blank

Assists

Last updated: 12 May 2015
Note: (*) Left the club before season finale.
Source: Match reports in Competitive matches  0 shown as blank

Disciplinary record

Note: (*) Left the club before season finale.
Last updated: 12 May 2015Competitive matches only * indicates a second yellow cardSource: Superleague Greece

Best Goal and MVP awards and nominees

Source: Best of Superleague 2014–2015

Infrastructure leagues

U20

Pos = Position; Pld = Matches played; Pts = Points
Source: Superleague U20

U17

Pos = Position; Pld = Matches played; Pts = Points
Source: Superleague U17

U15

Pos = Position; Pld = Matches played; Pts = Points
Source: Superleague U15

References

Veria F.C. seasons
Veria F.C.